Danillo is a given name. People with the name include:

Danillo Villefort (born 1983), Brazilian professional mixed martial artist
Danillo Sena, American politician in the Massachusetts House of Representatives
Danillo Bala (born 1993), Brazilian footballer
Danillo Ribeiro (born 1993), Brazilian footballer

See also
Danilo, a given name
Danylo (disambiguation)